Wellesley County is one of the 141 Cadastral divisions of New South Wales. It is located along the border with Victoria, with the Snowy River part of the northern boundary. It includes Bombala.

Wellesley County was named in honour of Governor General of India Richard Colley Wellesley, Marquis Wellesley (1760-1842).

Parishes within this county
A full list of parishes found within this county; their current LGA and mapping coordinates to the approximate centre of each location is as follows:

References

Counties of New South Wales